The Duke’s Mayo Bowl is an annual college football bowl game that has been played at Bank of America Stadium in Charlotte, North Carolina, since 2002. The game currently features a matchup between a team from the Atlantic Coast Conference (ACC) and a team from either the Southeastern Conference (SEC) or the Big Ten Conference. It was originally commissioned as the Queen City Bowl, but it has undergone several name changes since.

History
A new college football bowl game in Charlotte, North Carolina, was established in 2002 by Raycom Sports (now a part of Gray Television).  The game was certified by the NCAA as the Queen City Bowl, which became the Continental Tire Bowl (2002–2004), Meineke Car Care Bowl (2005–2010), and Belk Bowl (2011–2019) prior to its current name.

The game previously featured a matchup between the No. 5 selected Atlantic Coast Conference (ACC) team and the No. 3 selected American Athletic Conference (AAC). Originally, the bowl selected a team from the Big East Conference, until that conference's breakup in 2013.

In 2011, Charlotte-based department store chain Belk acquired the title sponsorship for a three-year period through 2013.  After the initial period, Belk extended its sponsorship for six years, through 2019.  As of 2014, the bowl featured the second pooled selection from the ACC paired against the second pooled selection from the Southeastern Conference (SEC), after selection of the College Football Playoff (CFP) teams.

On November 20, 2019, Belk informed bowl officials that the company would not be renewing its sponsorship after the 2019 season. In June 2020, Duke's Mayonnaise was announced as the new title sponsor for the bowl.  When Duke's Mayo assumed sponsorship, it chose to shower the winning coaches with mayonnaise instead of Gatorade.

In 2020, the ACC's opponent in the bowl is scheduled to begin alternating between the Big Ten Conference and SEC through 2025, with a Big Ten team playing in even-numbered years and an SEC team playing in odd-numbered years. The conference not sending a team to this bowl will send a team to the Las Vegas Bowl.

The 2020 game received notable social media coverage following the game as the quarterback of the winning team, Graham Mertz of Wisconsin, accidentally broke the glass trophy.

Game results
Rankings are based on the AP Poll prior to the game being played.

Source:

MVPs

Most appearances
Updated through the December 2022 edition (21 games, 42 total appearances).

Teams with multiple appearances

Teams with a single appearance
Won (5): Georgia, Kentucky, Mississippi State, Wisconsin, Maryland

Lost (6): Arkansas, Clemson, Connecticut, Duke, Navy, Texas A&M

Ten of the ACC's current 14 members (Boston College, Clemson, Duke, Louisville, North Carolina, NC State, Pittsburgh, Virginia, Virginia Tech and Wake Forest) have appeared in the game.  Members that have yet to appear include Florida State, Georgia Tech, Miami and Syracuse.  Both of Pittsburgh's appearances, and one appearance each by Boston College and Louisville, came while those schools were members of the Big East Conference.

Among former Big East Conference football members, Boston College, Cincinnati, Connecticut, Louisville, Pitt, South Florida, Virginia Tech and West Virginia have appeared in the game, while Miami, Rutgers, Syracuse and Temple have not.  Virginia Tech's appearances came as a member of the ACC.

Appearances by conference
Updated through the December 2022 edition (21 games, 42 total appearances).

 The American record includes appearances of the Big East Conference, as The American retains the charter of the original Big East, following its 2013 realignment. Teams representing the Big East appeared in 10 games, compiling a 5–5 record.
 Independents: Navy (2006)

Game records

Source:

Media coverage
The bowl was televised by ESPN2 from 2002 through 2005; since 2006, the bowl has been televised by ESPN.

The following is a list of the television networks and announcers who have broadcast the bowl game throughout the years.

Television

Radio

References

External links
 Official site

 
College football bowls
Recurring sporting events established in 2002